Nicolle Wallace (née Devenish; born February 4, 1972) is an American television host and author. She is known for her work as the anchor of the MSNBC news and politics program Deadline: White House and a former co-host of the ABC daytime talk show The View. As a political analyst for MSNBC and NBC News, she is a frequent on-air contributor to the programs Today, The 11th Hour with Stephanie Ruhle and Morning Joe.

In her former political career, Wallace served as the White House Communications Director during the presidency of George W. Bush and in his 2004 re-election campaign. Wallace also served as a senior advisor for John McCain's 2008 presidential campaign. In addition, she is the author of the contemporary political novels Eighteen Acres, It's Classified, and Madam President.

Early life
Nicolle Devenish was born on February 4, 1972, in Orange County, California to Veronica (née Zadis) and Clive Devenish. The eldest of four siblings, Zachary, Courtney and Ashley, she grew up in Orinda, a San Francisco Bay Area suburb. Her mother was a teacher's assistant for third-grade in public schools, and her father was an antiques dealer. Her grandfather, Thomas Devenish, was a Manhattan antiques dealer, part of "Devenish and Company". He was born in England to vaudevillian parents and immigrated to the United States with his family in 1947. Nicolle is also of Greek descent.

A 1990 graduate of Miramonte High School, Wallace received a Bachelor of Arts in mass communications from the University of California, Berkeley in 1994, and a master's degree from Northwestern University's Medill School of Journalism in 1996.

Political career
Briefly an on-air reporter in California, Wallace started her political career working in California state politics. In 1999, she moved to Florida to serve as Governor Jeb Bush's press secretary and then became the Communications Director for the Florida State Technology Office in 2000. Wallace worked on the 2000 Florida election recount.

White House and Bush 2004 presidential campaign
Wallace joined the White House staff during George W. Bush's first term, serving as special assistant to the President and director of media affairs at the White House, where she oversaw regional press strategy and outreach. In 2003, Wallace joined Bush's 2004 presidential campaign as its communications director, wherein according to The New York Times she "delivered her political attacks without snarling."

On January 5, 2005, Bush named Wallace White House Communications Director. The New York Times story announcing her presidential appointment carried the headline: "New Aide Aims to Defrost the Press Room" and described Wallace's intentions "to improve the contentious relationship between a secretive White House and the press." According to The Washington Post, Wallace served as "a voice for more openness with reporters", and former colleagues describe Wallace as having been "very persuasive in the halls of the West Wing." She left the White House in July 2006 to relocate to New York City, where her husband Mark was representing the Bush Administration at the United Nations. Her White House colleague, presidential political advisor Mark McKinnon, called her a "rare talent in politics."

McCain 2008 presidential campaign
Wallace also served as a senior advisor for the John McCain 2008 presidential campaign. She appeared frequently on network and cable news programs as the campaign's top spokesperson and defender.

In late October 2008, campaign aides criticized vice-presidential candidate Sarah Palin. One unnamed McCain aide said Palin had "gone rogue," placing her own future political interests ahead of the McCain/Palin ticket, directly contradicting her running mate's positions, and disobeying directions from campaign managers. In response to reports of dissension within the McCain-Palin campaign, Wallace issued a statement to both Politico and CNN saying: "If people want to throw me under the bus, my personal belief is that the most honorable thing to do is to lie there."

Wallace was portrayed by Sarah Paulson in the 2012 film Game Change. Wallace described the film as highly credible, saying the film "captured the spirit and emotion of the campaign." Wallace also told ABC News Chief Political Correspondent George Stephanopoulos that the film was "true enough to make me squirm." Eight years after the election, Wallace stated that she did not vote for a presidential candidate in 2008 because Sarah Palin gave her pause.

Other work

White House novel series
She is the author of the 2010 novel Eighteen Acres (a reference to the 18 acres on which the White House complex sits), a fictional narrative about three powerful women at the top of their careers: the first female U.S. President, her chief of staff, and a White House correspondent. Wallace said, "It's my best attempt at a story that I hope people will pick up and read and enjoy and maybe feel like they're getting to see what it's really like in the White House in this entirely fictional story."

Patrick Anderson of The Washington Post wrote, "To say that Nicolle Wallace's 'Eighteen Acres' is one of the best novels I've read about life in the White House may be faint praise—there haven't been many good ones—but her book is both an enjoyable read and a serious look at what high-level political pressures do to people." Craig Wilson of USA Today wrote, "Nicolle Wallace actually knows what she's talking about" and Ashley Parker of The New York Times called the book "an engaging, easy read." TV personalities such as George Stephanopoulos, Rachel Maddow, John King, and Andrea Mitchell also praised Eighteen Acres.

In September 2011, Wallace published the sequel to Eighteen Acres, It's Classified, about a fictional presidential campaign troubled by a mentally ill vice presidential candidate. Wallace said the premise was inspired by her experience as a senior adviser to the McCain/Palin campaign. Her third novel, Madam President, was released in April 2015.

Television

On September 3, 2014, ABC announced Wallace would join The View as a new co-host alongside newcomer Rosie Perez. Wallace made her debut as a co-host on the premiere of the series' 18th season on September 15, 2014. Wallace exited the series at the end of the season.

Following her departure from The View, Wallace joined NBC News and its cable network MSNBC as a political analyst. She was also a frequent contributor and guest host on MSNBC programs The 11th Hour with Brian Williams and Morning Joe as well as on NBC's Today Show. In November 2016, Wallace served as an analyst for MSNBC's live coverage of election results, which was anchored by Brian Williams, Rachel Maddow, and Chris Matthews. Since May 9, 2017, Wallace has been the anchor of the afternoon news and opinion program Deadline: White House on MSNBC. Deadline: White House garnered a total of 2 million viewers in July 2020, and in the following month, it was expanded to two hours.

Wallace was an executive producer on the July 3, 2022 MSNBC primetime special "Ukraine: Answering the Call", a fundraiser to support Ukraine during the 2022 invasion by Russia.

Personal life
Wallace married American businessman, former diplomat, and lawyer Mark Wallace in 2005. In 2012, the couple had  a son. In February 2013, both Wallace and her husband publicly supported the legalization of same-sex marriage in an amicus curiae brief submitted to the U.S. Supreme Court. She and Mark divorced in 2019.

Wallace described herself as a "self-loathing former Republican" in March 2021.

In April 2022, she married journalist Michael S. Schmidt.

Published works

References

Further reading

External links
 
 

|-

1972 births
21st-century American journalists
21st-century American novelists
21st-century American women writers
American civil servants
American people of English descent
American political consultants
American political commentators
American political writers
American television talk show hosts
American women non-fiction writers
American women novelists
American writers of Greek descent
California Republicans
Florida Republicans
George W. Bush administration personnel
John McCain 2008 presidential campaign
Living people
Medill School of Journalism alumni
Miramonte High School alumni
MSNBC people
New York (state) Republicans
People from Orinda, California
People from Orange County, California
University of California, Berkeley alumni
White House Communications Directors
Writers from California